Shatarudra Prakash is a leader of the Samajwadi Party in Uttar Pradesh.
On 10 June 2016, he was elected to the Uttar Pradesh Legislative Council.

References

Year of birth missing (living people)
Living people
Janata Party politicians
Members of the Uttar Pradesh Legislative Council
Janata Dal politicians
Samajwadi Party politicians
Lok Dal politicians
Bharatiya Janata Party politicians from Uttar Pradesh
Samajwadi Party politicians from Uttar Pradesh